"Shoot Your Best Shot" is a 1980 dance single by Linda Clifford. The single was from Clifford's album, I'm Yours and along with the track, "It Don't Hurt No More" reached number one on the US dance chart for four weeks. The single peaked at number forty-three on the Billboard soul singles chart.

References

1980 singles
1980 songs
Linda Clifford songs
Songs written by Isaac Hayes
RSO Records singles